Khaled Al-Aboud (born 1 May 1990) is a Saudi Arabian footballer who plays for Mudhar as a winger.

External links 
 

1990 births
Living people
Saudi Arabian footballers
Ettifaq FC players
Khaleej FC players
Al-Nojoom FC players
Hajer FC players
Al-Muzahimiyyah Club players
Al-Kawkab FC players
Al Safa FC players
Mudhar Club players
Saudi First Division League players
Saudi Professional League players
Saudi Second Division players
Saudi Third Division players
Place of birth missing (living people)
Association football wingers